Polyxeni "Pola" Kitsou (born ) is a retired Greek female volleyball player, who played mainly as a libero. On club level, she played most notably for Panellinios, Olympiacos and AEK Athens, winning two Greek Championships in 2002 and 2012. Kitsou had also a successful career as a beach volley player, winning two Greek Championships in 2002 and 2004 and having participated in numerous international events.

References

External links
profile at worldofvolley.com
Πόλα Κίτσου, το τέλος ενός Θρύλου at novasports.gr 

1972 births
Living people
Greek women's volleyball players
Olympiacos Women's Volleyball players
Greek beach volleyball players
Volleyball players from Athens